Stone Tower may refer to:

Stone Tower (album), by Delerium
Stone Tower (Dortmund), a historic watchtower in Dortmund, Germany
Stone Tower (Ptolemy), a historical landmark on the Silk Road